All the Hits Tour was a concert tour by English musician Elton John that took place in North America, Europe and Oceania in 2015.

Background
The first concert to be announced for the tour was a concert in Wellington, New Zealand. This will be John's nineteenth concert in New Zealand and his first concert in Wellington for nine years. A second concert was announced for Honolulu in January 2015.  It was recently announced that Bright Light Bright Light will be the support act on the UK leg of the tour.

Set list 
 "Funeral for a Friend/Love Lies Bleeding"
 "Bennie and the Jets"
 "Candle in the Wind"
 "All the Girls Love Alice"
 "Levon"
 "Tiny Dancer"
 "Believe"
 "Daniel"
 "Philadelphia Freedom"
 "Goodbye Yellow Brick Road"
 "Rocket Man (I Think It's Going to Be a Long, Long Time)"
 "Hey Ahab"
 "I Guess That's Why They Call It the Blues"
 "The One"
 "Your Song"
 "Burn Down the Mission"
 "Sad Songs (Say So Much)"
 "Don't Let the Sun Go Down on Me"
 "The Bitch Is Back"
 "I'm Still Standing"
 "Your Sister Can't Twist (But She Can Rock 'n Roll)"
 "Saturday Night's Alright for Fighting"
 "Crocodile Rock"

Tour dates
List of concerts, showing date, city, country, venue, tickets sold, number of available tickets and amount of gross revenue

Tour band
Elton John – Piano, vocals
Davey Johnstone – Guitar, banjo, backing vocals
Matt Bissonette – Bass guitar, backing vocals
Kim Bullard – keyboards
John Mahon – Percussion, backing vocals
Nigel Olsson – drums, backing vocals

Notes

External links
Elton John's official website

References

Elton John concert tours
2015 concert tours